Aainaate (English: In the Mirror) is a 2008 Bengali drama film directed by  Dulal Dey. The film stars Rituparna Sengupta,  Firdous Ahmed and Rati Agnihotri first appearance in Bengali cinema.

Plot
The story about Malini (Rituparna Sengupta) who recapitulating her childhood memories while recollecting her family attachments she remembers the detachment from her inner self grounded by the molestation in her teenage. Malini is now a well-versed photographer working in some magazine. Her photographic skills explores through the various special expressions of the people when they are dead and seeks to find out the emotions of the pale and white faces. During these ongoing course of actions she comes in contact with Urmila Sanyal (Rati Agnihotri), the leading social activist who has dedicated her life to the service of the exploited and distressed women of the society. The story then takes a turn to her romantic journey with her boyfriend, Rajat (Firdous Ahmed) who is the lavish brat of a big businessman. On one hand there is the family expectations tied to her and on the other there is urge for preserving her self-identity. Though she gets romantically involved with Rajat along with her family support but then nobody is ready to bear its outcomes. It is then when she becomes pregnant, she realizes the real faces of the people whom she has been respecting and admiring so much. In a moment she is being out cast and constantly pressurized to surrender to the patriarchal will. But revolting against it she comes to discover the illegitimacy of her own birth and finds Urmila Sanyal as her escapist mother, who was scared of the social accusations.

Cast
 Rituparna Sengupta as Malini
 Firdous Ahmed as Rajat
 Rati Agnihotri as Urmila Sanyal
 Soumitra Chatterjee as Boren Sanyal
 Deepankar De as Mama
 Pushpita Mukherjee as Khuku

Soundtrack
Composer: Joydeb Sen

"Roj Shata Shata Mukh" - Kavita Krishnamurthy
"Swapno Rangano (Duet)" - Kumar Sanu
"Tumi Dekhale" (part 1) - Sadhana Sargam
"Jani E Lagan" - Kumar Sanu
"Premer Chhowa" - Ritika Sahani, Soham
"Swapno Rangano (Male)" - Kumar Sanu
"Tumi Dekhale" (part 2) - Sadhana Sargam
"Swapno Rangano (Female) - Alka Yagnik

References

External links 
 Aaynate at the Gomolo
 www.telegraphindia.com preview

2008 films
Bengali-language Indian films
2000s Bengali-language films